Bruno Toledo may refer to:

 Bruno Toledo (runner) (born 1973), Spanish long-distance runner
 Bruno Toledo (footballer) (born 1994), Uruguayan footballer